Nightstreet is the debut studio album by Australian rock band, Roxus. It was released in August 1991 and peaked at number five on the ARIA Albums chart.

Background 

Nighstreet was issued on 18 August 1991 by Australian hard rock band, Roxus. They had formed in Melbourne in 1987 and by April 1991 had the line-up of Darren Danielson on drums, John "Stones" Nixon on bass guitar, Juno Roxas on lead vocals, Andy Shanahan on keyboards and Dragan Stanić on guitar. The album was produced by Mark Opitz for Melodian. According to Australian musicologist, Ian McFarlane, "[it] mixed Warrant/Bryan Adams-like soft metal raunch ('Bad Boys', 'Rock'n'Roll Nights') with lush power ballads ('Where are You Now?', 'This Time')." Nightstreet provided three singles, "Where Are You Now?" (April 1991), "Bad Boys" (July) and Jimi G (September 1991).

Track listing

CD/Vinyl/Cassette (30555)
 "Rock 'N' Roll Nights" (Dragan Stanić, Noel Hart) – 4:09
 "My Way" (Juno Roxas, Joseph La Ferlita) – 3:58
 "Bad Boys" (Roxas, Stanić, Darren Danielson) – 3:02
 "Midnight Love" (John Nixon, La Ferlita, Danielson, Andy Shanahan) – 3:51
 "Where Are You Now?" (Roxas, Robin Randall, Judithe Randall) – 4:21
 "Nightstreet" (Roxas, Stanić, Nixon) – 2:59
 "This Time" (Stanić, Nixon, Danielson) – 4:52
 "First Break of the Heart	(Steven Kara, Stanić, Paul Gleeson) – 4:37
 "Stand Back" (Prince Rogers Nelson, Stevie Nicks) – 3:43
 "Jimi G" (Roxas) – 4:42

Charts

Certifications

References

External links

 "Nightstreet" by Roxus at Discogs

1991 debut albums
Roxus albums